Knowle Cricket Club Ground is a cricket ground in Bristol.  The first recorded match on the ground was in 1894, when Knowle played Frenchay.  In 1926 the ground held its first first-class match when Somerset played Hampshire in the County Championship.  The following season the ground held a further first-class match when Somerset played Worcestershire.  The final first-class match held at the ground came in 1928 when Somerset played Essex.

Still in use to this day, the ground is the home venue of Knowle Cricket Club.

References

External links
Knowle Cricket Club Ground on CricketArchive
Knowle Cricket Club Ground on Cricinfo

Cricket grounds in Bristol
Sports venues completed in 1894
Somerset County Cricket Club